Bieniek is a surname. Notable people with the surname include:

 Mateusz Bieniek (born 1994), Polish volleyball player
 Michał Bieniek (born 1984), Polish high jumper
 Zdzisław Bieniek (1930–2017), Polish footballer

See also
 

Polish-language surnames
Surnames from given names